Ministries of Kaduna State are official branches legally approved by the state government for carrying a specific project inside Kaduna State. The ministries are govern by appointed commissioners by the state governor and approved by the State House of Assembly.. In 2019 the governor of the state Nasir Ahmad el-Rufai cut down the rate of ministries from 19 to 14 ministries. The governor signed an executive order to create another three new ministries apart from the old ones.

Ministries 
The governor of the state made a new structure, He signed an Executive Order to create and restructure ministries in Kaduna State. The order abolishes the Ministry of Commerce, Industry & Tourism, the Ministry of Rural & Community Development and the Ministry of Water Resources. It amends the mandates of the ministries responsible for local government, women and social development, works and sports.

References